Lagos steam tramway was a passenger and sanitary tramway that carried cargo and passengers within Lagos Colony. The tram was an important public transit system connecting travelers and merchandise from Ibadan and Abeokuta via the railway terminus at Iddo, mainland Lagos to Port of Lagos. The system ran from 1902 to 1933, it carried passengers and goods for twelve years from 1902 to 1914 and nightsoil from 1906 to 1933.

Steam tramway

Passenger and goods line
Between 1901 and 1902, public sanitation and mosquito eradication palliatives resulted in the construction of an iron bridge over Five Cowrie Creek and swamp land reclamation projects at Kokomaiko. When the colonial government completed the Lagos to Ibadan rail track, the terminal on the Lagos side ended on Lagos mainland and a system had to be devised to link Iddo with the Port of Lagos and other areas on the Island. In 1901, construction commenced of a single track over Carter Bridge. The tram was open to the public in 1902, the passenger cars ran northwards from Kokomaiko in the Marina side of Lagos passing customs wharf then turning left into Balogun Street to Iddo train terminus via Ereko, Ebute Ero, Idumota and Carter Bridge. The passenger line was one of the earliest public transport system built within Lagos, it carried travelers, traders and workers from the train station at Iddo going to Lagos Island.

The line was a single track tramway with a 2 ft 6 in gauge and 7 passing loops on the track. There was a run-in at Iddo terminus with sidings to the goods warehouse.

Sanitary line
In 1906, the sanitary tramway, also called Kokomaiko began operations, it ran from Agarawu through Massey Street and Cow Lane via George V road, Onikan crossing over Five Cowrie Bridge to end at Dejection Jetty. The tram carried nightsoil.

Rolling stock

Locomotives 
The steam tram Lagos had five 0-4-4 locomotives Nos. 101 to 105, which were manufactured by Hunslet Engine Company in Leeds, England. The locomotives No. 101-103 were built in 1910 with the factory numbers 751-753, and No. 104-105 were built in 1910 with the factory numbers 1016-1017. They had outside cylinders with a bore x stroke of 6¼ inches x 8 inches (159 x 203 mm) and a wheel diameter of 1 foot 6½ in (470 mm).

The fecal sheet had two 0-4-0 saddle tank locomotives from WG Bagnall of Stafford. They had outside cylinders of 7 inches by 12 inches (178 x 305 mm) and a wheel diameter of 1 foot 9½ inches (521 mm). The locomotive 1906 built locomotive with the factory number 1779 was called Kokomaiko, which describes the sound of the locomotive. The other locomotive was built in 1911 with the factory number 1944. It had no name tag but was colloquially called New Sanitary.

Carriages and wagons 
The cars were built by Ashbury Railway Carriage & Iron Company and consisted of 10 passenger trailer units and 20 goods units.

See also 
 Transportation in Lagos
 Lagos Rail Mass Transit

References

Rail transport in Lagos
History of Lagos
Tram transport